Whenuapai is a suburb and aerodrome located in northwestern Auckland, in the North Island of New Zealand. It is located on the northwestern shore of the Waitematā Harbour, 15 kilometres to the northwest of Auckland's city centre. It is one of the landing points for the Southern Cross telecommunications Cables. The name is Māori for good land.

Demographics

Whenuapai had a population of 3,888 at the 2018 New Zealand census, an increase of 159 people (4.3%) since the 2013 census, and an increase of 249 people (6.8%) since the 2006 census. There were 1,263 households, comprising 2,016 males and 1,872 females, giving a sex ratio of 1.08 males per female. The median age was 34.8 years (compared with 37.4 years nationally), with 678 people (17.4%) aged under 15 years, 981 (25.2%) aged 15 to 29, 1,815 (46.7%) aged 30 to 64, and 411 (10.6%) aged 65 or older.

Ethnicities were 80.6% European/Pākehā, 12.3% Māori, 5.8% Pacific peoples, 11.7% Asian, and 3.3% other ethnicities. People may identify with more than one ethnicity.

The percentage of people born overseas was 24.2, compared with 27.1% nationally.

Although some people chose not to answer the census's question about religious affiliation, 60.3% had no religion, 29.8% were Christian, 0.2% had Māori religious beliefs, 0.8% were Hindu, 0.7% were Muslim, 1.2% were Buddhist and 1.8% had other religions.

Of those at least 15 years old, 789 (24.6%) people had a bachelor's or higher degree, and 345 (10.7%) people had no formal qualifications. The median income was $43,800, compared with $31,800 nationally. 765 people (23.8%) earned over $70,000 compared to 17.2% nationally. The employment status of those at least 15 was that 1,902 (59.3%) people were employed full-time, 486 (15.1%) were part-time, and 96 (3.0%) were unemployed.

History

In the 19th century, northern Whenuapai was the location of Ockleston's pottery, a brickworks located on the Kotukutuku Inlet of the Waitematā Harbour.

RNZAF facilities

Construction of Whenuapai as a base for Wellington bomber aircraft began in 1937.

Post World War II Auckland became a centre for RNZAF transport and maritime squadrons. From 1945 to 1965 Whenuapai was also Auckland's civil international airport. Whenuapai and Hobsonville bases were integrated in 1965 to form RNZAF Base Auckland. Hobsonville is now closed, with the RNZAF continuing to lease a few remaining facilities.

Today, with a personnel strength of around 1100, Base Auckland is the home for:

 No. 5 Squadron (P-3K2 Orion)
 No. 6 Squadron (SH-2G(I) Seasprite)
 No. 40 Squadron (C-130 Hercules and Boeing 757)
 RNZAF Parachute Training and Support Unit,
 RNZAF Security Forces Military Working Dog Training School
 RNZAF Aviation Medicine Unit.
 RNZAF Operations Squadron
 RNZAF Police

Whenuapai Airport 1945–65
In 1945 the government made the RNZAF Station at Whenuapai available for civil airline operations on a temporary basis and with RNZAF activities to take precedence. That "temporary basis" lasted twenty years and the RNZAF had to give up their two smaller hangars and move to the north apron of their own airfield. In the 1940s Whenuapai was one of three aerodromes in the country with sealed runways, the others being Paraparaumu and Ohakea. Whenuapai was adopted as the international airport for Auckland, despite the benefits of the location of the Mangere Aerodrome, due to its ongoing use by the RNZAF meaning there were no additional costs for the Auckland City Council.

For a short time, Auckland had three aerodromes—the seaplane aerodrome at Mechanics Bay where Tasman Empire Airways Limited (TEAL) operated from 1940–54; the city's domestic airport—at the then small grass airstrip at Mangere, on the site of the present Auckland Airport; and weekly Pan American and British Commonwealth Pacific Airlines (the latter's services originally operated by Australian National Airways) services with DC-4s from Whenuapai.  Also immediately post-war; the RNZAF operated many of the civil services while National Airways Corporation (NAC) was being organised, and to add to the confusion; some of Auckland's domestic services departed from Whenuapai as well. Hills adjacent to the Whenuapai site limited the ability of new generation aircraft to use the site.

In 1947 the government closed Mangere to all but light aircraft citing safety concerns, and NAC moved to Whenuapai. (At the same time, the government closed Wellington's Rongotai Airport, for the same reasons, and NAC had to move to Paraparaumu, 35 miles from the city.)

In addition to domestic services, NAC flew a DC-3 weekly to Norfolk Island from Whenuapai, and fortnightly on a route that took a week each way; Whenuapai—Norfolk Island—Nadi—Apia—Tongatapu—Aitutaki—Rarotonga.  The Norfolk Island service continued until 1955 when Qantas, chartered to TEAL, took over the route with a DC-4; and the Pacific Service was handed over to TEAL in 1952.

The next major development at Whenuapai was in May 1954, when British Commonwealth Pacific Airlines was wound up, its DC-6s given to TEAL, and that airline sold all except two of its flying boats and moved to Whenuapai. It kept one Solent in reserve and sent the other to Suva to fly the leg to Tahiti, which didn't get a landplane airport until 1960.  The first part of the Coral Route was then operated by DC-6 from Whenuapai to Nadi.

Airport diagram for 1956

Despite problems with its runway Whenuapai continued as Auckland's international airport through the 1950s. In 1960 the longest runway was 6590 feet (6664 ft a few years later) which allowed BOAC Comet flights, but larger jet airliners such as the DC-8 and the B707 demanded a new international airport and work on Auckland Airport began. The first international flight from Auckland Airport was on 24 November 1965 and it officially opened on Anniversary Weekend (29–31 January), 1966 after which Whenuapai Airport reverted to purely military use as an Aerodrome.

Reverting to Military Aerodrome and recent developments
The operational tempo at Whenuapai continues at the level it has been at for the last forty years, although the closure of the adjacent Hobsonville base has seen the departure of rotary operations (primarily the UH1H Iroquois) to RNZAF Base Ohakea.  With the budget for moving the base to Ohakea exceeding one billion dollars, the previously scheduled closure by the New Zealand Labour government (originally by 2007, then 2010 or, at latest, 2014) was cancelled by the incoming National government of 2008. There were suggestions that it be used as Auckland's second international Airport. Reasons put forward in favour were that more people in the Auckland region already lived closer to the aerodrome than to Mangere Airport and that it was projected that within 15 years Whenuapai would be closer for more than a million Aucklanders.

The three local authorities that comprised the north west sector of the Auckland Region, Rodney District Council, North Shore City Council and Waitakere City Council all favoured the second airport concept at one time or another and at least one poll, by the Waitakere City Council in late 2006, indicated 77% support and 22% opposition by the public.

However, in the local body elections of October 2007, the pro-airport North Shore City mayor was defeated by an anti-airport mayoral candidate with indications that the airport issue was the most important of factors considered by voters.

Subsequently, North Shore City Council reversed support for a Whenuapai International Airport while the Waitakere City Council remained in favour. In 2010, all councils were amalgamated into the new Auckland Council and therefore support for a commercial airport was dropped. The proposal had also been opposed by the government.

Airlines of Whenuapai (Chronological Order)

† This was as scheduled operations on its own account.  As QANTAS owned half of TEAL until 1961; before then its aircraft only appeared at Whenuapai if chartered by TEAL, or if its aircraft were chartered for a trip across to New Zealand, although it did occasionally appear at Whenuapai between 1956–61 with its Super Constellations at peak traffic times.

References
General
The Auckland Scrapbook, Auckland City Library (microfiche)
The New Zealand Scrapbook, Auckland City Library (microfiche)
Auckland Municipal Airport Files, Auckland City Council Archives
Specific

External links
RNZAF Parachute Training and Support Unit
RNZAF Aviation Medicine Unit
Whenuapai Aviation Sports Club

Suburbs of Auckland
Upper Harbour Local Board Area
Airports in New Zealand
Populated places around the Waitematā Harbour
West Auckland, New Zealand